Maria Pauer (October 1734/36 – 1750 in Salzburg), was an alleged Austrian witch. She was the last person to be executed for witchcraft in Austria. 

Maria Pauer was a maid in the St. Catherine suburb in Mühldorf. In January 1749, she had run an errand for her employer to another house, and afterwards, the house was tormented by poltergeist phenomena. This led to her arrest. The conditions in prison made her apathetic and weak. She was interrogated with 527 questions in two months. Anna Maria Zötlin and Liesel Gusterer were also arrested and executed in 1749. Torture was used, and in September 1750, she confessed her guilt. She was sentenced to death and decapitated and burned on October 6, 1750.

References 
 , Statement of regret of archbishop Dr. Alois Kothgasser, Salzburg, regarding the judicial murder of Maria Pauer, June 18, 2009 (in German)
 Neumeyer, August Friedrich: Der Mühldorfer Hexenprozess 1749/50, Mühldorf 1992
 Byloff, Fritz: Die letzten Zaubereiprozesse in Mühldorf und Landshut. In: Zeitschrift für bayerische Landesgeschichte (ZBLG), Jg. 1938, S. 427–444
 Nagl, Heinz: Der Zauberer-Jackl-Prozess. Hexenprozesse im Erzstift Salzburg 1675–1690. In: Mitteilungen der Gesellschaft für Salzburger Landeskunde, Teil I, Jg. 1972/73, S. 385–541

People executed for witchcraft
1734 births
Executed Austrian women
1750 deaths
18th-century Austrian people
Executed Austrian people
People executed in the Holy Roman Empire by decapitation
18th-century executions in the Holy Roman Empire
Witch trials in Austria